The 2022–23 Evansville Purple Aces men's basketball team represented the University of Evansville in the 2022–23 NCAA Division I men's basketball season. The Purple Aces, led by first-year head coach David Ragland, played their home games at the Ford Center in Evansville, Indiana as members of the Missouri Valley Conference. They finished the season 5–27, 1–19 in MVC play to finish in last place. They lost to Indiana State in the first round of the MVC tournament.

Previous season
The Purple Aces finished the 2021–22 season 6–24, 2–16 in MVC play to finish in tenth place. As the No. 10 seed, they lost to No. 7 seed Valparaiso in the opening round of the MVC tournament.

On May 5, the school announced the departure of head coach Todd Lickliter, after two full seasons as head coach. On May 24, it was announced that Evansville alum and Butler assistant coach David Ragland would be named the Purple Ace's next head coach.

Roster

Schedule and results

|-
!colspan=12 style=| Exhibition

|-
!colspan=12 style=| Regular season

|-
!colspan=12 style=| MVC tournament

Sources

References

Evansville Purple Aces men's basketball seasons
Evansville Purple Aces
Evansville Purple Aces men's basketball
Evansville Purple Aces men's basketball